The 2021 ESF Women's Championship was an international European softball competition that was held in Friuli Venezia Giulia, Italy; from 27 June to 3 July 2021.

Round Robin 1

Pool A 

June 27

June 28

June 29

Pool B 

June 27

June 28

June 29

Pool C 

June 27

June 28

June 29

Pool D 

June 27

June 28

June 29

Round Robin 2

Pool E 

June 30

July 1

Pool F 

June 30

July 1

Pool G 

June 30

July 1

July 2

Pool H 

June 30

July 1

July 2

Final Round Robin

Pool X 

July 1

July 2

Classification round

15th-place game

13th-place game

11th-place game

9th-place game

7th-place game

3rd-place game

Championship Game

Final standings

Statistics leaders

Batting 

* Minimum 1.0 plate appearances per game

Pitching 

* Minimum 1.0 inning pitched per game

References 

Women's Softball European Championship